USS Coral (PY-15), previously USS Sialia (SP-543), was a yacht in commission in the United States Navy as a Patrol Yacht from 1940 to 1943.

Construction, acquisition, and commissioning

Coral (PY-15) was built in 1913 by Pusey and Jones, Wilmington, Delaware.  It served during World War I as USS Sialia (SP-543).  She was re-acquired by the Navy 25 November 1940 and commissioned 27 February 1941.

Service history

Coral made two Naval Reserve cruises from Philadelphia during June 1941, then sailed 30 August for Newport and inshore patrol duty until 8 October. After training at Guantanamo Bay, she served at Key West, Florida with Service Squadron 9 until decommissioned 12 August 1943. Recommissioned 27 August to escort a convoy to Norfolk, she arrived 6 September, and was again decommissioned 10 September 1943. Coral was sold 15 July 1947.

References

External links

Patrol vessels of the United States Navy
World War II patrol vessels of the United States
Ships built by Pusey and Jones
1914 ships